Phong Nha is a township (thị trấn) in Bố Trạch District, Quảng Bình Province, North Central Coast Region of Vietnam. The township was formerly the rural commune of Sơn Trạch.

Phong Nha township is located by Son River and contains part of Phong Nha-Kẻ Bàng National Park, a UNESCO's World Heritage Site. Tourist service facilities for this national park are located in this township. Phong Nha was a fierce battlefield during the Vietnam War. The local inhabitants live mainly on agriculture and tourism.

Notes and references

 

Populated places in Quảng Bình province
Townships in Vietnam
Communes of Quảng Bình province